Mutagen X (MX), or 3-chloro-4-(dichloromethyl)-5-hydroxy-5H-furan-2-one, is a byproduct of the disinfection of water by chlorination.  MX is produced by reaction of chlorine with natural humic acids.

MX is found in chlorinated drinking water all over the world and is an environmental carcinogen that is known to cause several types of cancer in rats when present in large enough concentrations.  It is listed by the International Agency for Research on Cancer as a group 2B carcinogen meaning it is "possibly carcinogenic to humans".  Although the concentration of MX in drinking water is typically 100- to 1000-fold lower than other common byproducts of water chlorination such as trihalomethanes, MX might play a role in the increased cancer risks that have been associated with the consumption of chlorinated water because of its potency in inducing DNA damage.

References

External links
California Office of Environmental Health Hazard Assessment report on MX

Organochlorides
IARC Group 2B carcinogens
Furanones
Secondary alcohols